Škoda 24Tr Irisbus (known as Irisbus Skoda 24Tr in Western Europe) is a low-entry trolleybus model built from 2003 until 2014 by Czech trolleybus manufacturer Škoda Electric (subsidiary of Škoda Transportation), supplying electrical equipment, in cooperation with Irisbus, supplying body.

Development 

After a relatively successful effort to unify bus and trolleybus (Karosa ŠM 11/Škoda T-11, Karosa B 831/Škoda 17Tr and Skoda 21ab/Škoda 21Tr) Czechs took fourth attempt, and created a trolleybus Škoda 24Tr. Trolleybus Skoda 24Tr is based on the Irisbus Agora bus and upgraded version Irisbus Citelis.

The Škoda 24Tr trolleybus is a two-axle trolleybus with self-supporting body. Trolleybus is a low floor, only the back of the seats on the stand. Thanks to air cushion properties (the ability to lower the air pressure trolley on the right) moves to the trolley stop is able to fall to the pavement level. Trolley on the right side there are three double doors with a "stop" button, which opens at the passenger's request.

Electrical equipment, based on IGBT transistor base, are placed in special containers on the roof. Some trolleybuses have built-in auxillary diesel generators. This allows the trolleys divert from routes in case it isn’t possible to power the trolley using contact poles, or if it’s necessary to detour on streets without overhead wire coverage. Diesel generators are also used to extend the operating range where there isn’t overhead wire coverage when running on regular routes, such as the Riga 9th and 27th trolleybus routes.

The first trolleybus was built on the Citybus bus-based (based on the roof of CNG-based). Due to this type of bus abandonment and replacement by more modern buses Citelis, the trolley body was based on Citelis base (such trolleybuses began producing 2005), but the name remained unchanged at Citelis.

Production 
Trolleybuses produced between 2003 and 2014.

See also 
 List of buses

References 

Škoda vehicles
Buses of the Czech Republic
Full-size buses
Trolleybuses
Low-entry buses